Franciszek Leja (27 January 1885 in Grodzisko Górne near Leżajsk – 11 October 1979 in Kraków, Poland) was a Polish mathematician.

He was born to a poor peasant family in the southeastern Poland. After graduating from the University of Lwów he was a teacher of mathematics and physics in high schools from 1910 until 1923, among others in Kraków. From 1924 until 1936 he was a professor at the Warsaw University of Technology  and Warsaw University, from 1936 until 1960 in the Jagiellonian University.

He was captured by German Nazi during Sonderaktion Krakau and sent with 183 Polish professors of the Jagiellonian University and University of Technology to Sachsenhausen concentration camp. After international protest by prominent Italians including Benito Mussolini and the Vatican, 101 professors who were older than 40 were released from Sachsenhausen on February 8, 1940. Unfortunately Leja, older than 40, was not in the group of released prisoners. He stayed in a concentration camp until May 1940 when he returned to Kraków. In Kraków bad news were waiting for him: the university was closed, Leja's apartment was taken over by Nazi. The homeless couple with no income decided to move to Grodzisko Górne where they have a small house and garden. They got a permission from Gestapo and left Kraków. In Grodzisko Leja wrote the book on the calculus Rachunek różniczkowy i całkowy ze wstępem do równań różniczkowych.

Since 1948 he worked for the Institute of Mathematics of the Polish Academy of Sciences. He was a co-founder of the Polish Mathematics Society in 1919 and from 1963 until 1965 the President. Since 1931, he was a member of the Warsaw Science Society (TNW).

His main scientific interests concentrated on analytic functions, in particular the method of extremal points and transfinite diameters. He was also interested in topology; he introduced the definition of topological group

Works
 Rachunek różniczkowy i całkowy ze wstępem do równań różniczkowych, first edition in 1947, Polish Mathematical Society, 17 edition in 2008 PWN.
 Funkcje zespolone (pub. 1967, pub. 5 1979).
 Teoria funkcji analitycznych, PWN, Warszawa 1957.

See also
 Kraków School of Mathematics

References

1885 births
1979 deaths
People from Leżajsk County
Polish mathematicians
Academic staff of the Warsaw University of Technology
Academic staff of Jagiellonian University